Mustang Sally may refer to:
"Mustang Sally" (song), written and recorded by Mack Rice, later covered by The Rascals and Wilson Pickett
"Mustang Sally & GTO", a song from blues musician John Lee Hooker's More Real Folk Blues: The Missing Album
Mustang Sally (film), a 2006 horror movie
Salvatore "Mustang Sally" Intile, a minor character on The Sopranos